William Smarte (ca. 1530 – 23 September 1599), of Ipswich, Suffolk, was an English politician.

He was a Member of Parliament (MP) in the 7th Parliament of Queen Elizabeth I, representing Ipswich in 1588.

He made a substantial endowment to the almshouses in Ipswich in 1591, which then became known as the Tooley's and Smart's Almshouses.

References

1530s births
1599 deaths
Members of the Parliament of England (pre-1707) for Ipswich
English MPs 1589